This is a list of supermarket companies in the United States of America and the names of supermarkets which are owned or franchised by these companies. For supermarkets worldwide, see List of supermarkets.

National chains 
 Ahold Delhaize – Operates under the following brands:
Food Lion (Delaware, Georgia, Kentucky, Maryland, North Carolina, Pennsylvania, South Carolina, Tennessee, Virginia and West Virginia)
Giant
Hannaford (Maine, Massachusetts, New Hampshire, New York, Vermont)
Stop and Shop (Massachusetts)
 Kroger – Besides the parent company, stores operate under these brands:
Safeway (Proposed, pending sale. Safeway is currently a wholly owned subsidiary of Albertsons). (Alaska, Arizona, California, Colorado, Delaware, Hawaii, Idaho, Maryland, Montana, Nebraska, Nevada, New Mexico, Oregon, South Dakota, Virginia, District of Columbia, Washington, Wyoming)
Albertsons(Proposed, pending approval of acquisition by Kroger). (Arkansas, Arizona, California, Colorado, Idaho, Louisiana, Montana, Nevada New Mexico, North Dakota, Oregon, Texas, Utah, Washington, Wyoming)
Kroger (Alabama, Alaska, Arkansas, Arizona, California, Colorado, Delaware, Florida, Georgia, Idaho, Illinois, Indiana, Kansas, Kentucky, Louisiana, Maryland, Michigan, Mississippi, Missouri, Montana, Nebraska, Nevada, New Mexico, North Carolina, Ohio, Oregon, South Carolina, Texas, Utah, Virginia, West Virginia, Tennessee, Washington, Wisconsin, Wyoming)
 Target
Costco
Walmart
Walmart Neighborhood Market
Sam’s Club

Regional chains

West

Midwest

Northeast

South

Notable local chains

Acme Fresh Market (Northeastern Ohio)
Amigo Supermarkets (Puerto Rico)
Berkeley Bowl (Berkeley, California)
Big Y (Massachusetts and Connecticut)
Buehler's (North-central Ohio)
Caraluzzi's (Connecticut)
Central Market (Texas)
County Market - H.E.B
Crest Foods (Oklahoma)
Cub Foods (Minnesota and one location in Freeport, IL)
D'Agostino Supermarkets (New York City)
Dierbergs Markets (St. Louis area)
Fairway Market (New York City area)
Festival Foods (Wisconsin)
The Food Emporium (New York City area)
Food Town (Houston, Texas)
Foodarama (Houston, Texas)
Foodland (Hawaii)
FoodLand Supermarkets (Alabama, Georgia, South Carolina, North Carolina, Tennessee, Kentucky, West Virginia, Pennsylvania, Ohio)
Foodtown (New Jersey, New York, Pennsylvania)
Gelson's Markets (Southern California)
Gristedes (New York City)
Harding's - Harding's Market, Marketplace, and Fresh Express (Southwest Michigan, Northern Indiana) - sells SpartanNash OurFamily Products
Harmons Grocery (Utah)
Heinen's Fine Foods (Cleveland and Chicago metro areas)
Highland Park Markets (Connecticut)
Hitchcock's  Markets  (Florida)
Homeland (Kansas, Oklahoma, Georgia, Texas)
Houchens Markets (Kentucky, Tennessee, Ohio, Indiana, Illinois)
Hugo's (Minnesota, North Dakota)
Jerry's Foods (Minnesota)
Jon's Marketplace (Southern California)
Karns Quality Foods (Harrisburg, Pennsylvania area)
Key Food (New York City metro area)
King Kullen (Long Island, New York)
Kowalski's Markets (Minnesota)
Kuhn's Quality Foods (Pittsburgh, Pennsylvania)
Lowes Foods (North Carolina, South Carolina, Virginia)
Lowe's Market (Texas, New Mexico)
Lunds & Byerlys (Minnesota)
Magruder's (Washington, D.C. area)
Market Basket (Southeastern Texas, Southwestern Louisiana)
Market Basket (New England) (Maine, Massachusetts, New Hampshire, Rhode Island)
Market of Choice (Oregon)
Met Foodmarkets (New York City, New Jersey, Massachusetts)
Morton Williams (New York, New Jersey)
Moser's Foods (Missouri)
Mr. Special (Puerto Rico)
No Frills Supermarkets (Omaha, Nebraska)
New Seasons Market (Portland, Oregon)
Nugget Markets (Northern California)
Pantry Pride - (St Marys, Ohio)
Price Chopper (Kansas City & Des Moines metro areas)
Pueblo (Puerto Rico)
Pac n Save (Rural Nebraska)
Quality Dairy Company (Mid-Michigan)
Reasors (Eastern Oklahoma)
Redner's Markets (Eastern Pennsylvania; also in Delaware and Maryland)
Remke Markets (Cincinnati, Ohio area)
Ridley's Family Markets (Idaho, Nevada, Utah, Wyoming)
Riesbeck's (West Virginia, Ohio)
Roche Bros (Massachusetts)
Rosauers Supermarkets (Idaho, Montana, Oregon, Washington)
Rouses (Alabama, Louisiana, Mississippi)
Scolari's Food and Drug (California, Nevada)
Seabra Foods  (New Jersey, South Florida, Rhode Island, Massachusetts)
Seller's Brothers (Houston, Texas)
Sendik's Food Market (Wisconsin)
Sentry Foods (Wisconsin)
Shoppers Food & Pharmacy (Baltimore and Washington, D.C. areas)
Sleeper's Supermarket (Maine)
Stater Brothers (California)
Stew Leonard's (Connecticut, New York, New Jersey)
Strack & Van Til (Indiana)
Straub's Markets (St. Louis, Missouri)
Sullivan's Foods (Northwest Illinois)
SuperFresh (New York, New Jersey)
Super One Foods (Minnesota, Wisconsin, Michigan, North Dakota)
Super King Markets (California)
Supermercados Selectos (Puerto Rico)
The Fresh Grocer (Pennsylvania, Delaware)
Times Supermarkets (Hawaii)
United Grocery Outlet (Tennessee, North Carolina)
Westborn Market (Michigan)
Western Beef (New York City, Florida)
Woodman's Food Market (Illinois, Wisconsin)
Yoke's Fresh Market (Washington, Idaho)
Food Rite (West Tennessee)

Retailers' cooperatives 

 Affiliated Food Stores (Texas panhandle, Oklahoma, Kansas, New Mexico, Colorado, Arizona, Wyoming)
 Affiliated Foods Midwest (Colorado, Illinois, Iowa, Kansas, Minnesota, Missouri, Nebraska, North Dakota, Oklahoma, South Dakota, Wisconsin)
 Associated Food Stores – formerly Pacific Mercantile Cooperative; also see Western Family Foods
 Lee's Marketplace
 Associated Grocers
 Associated Grocers of Florida
 Associated Grocers of New England
 Apple Market
 Cash Saver
 Country Mart
 Price Chopper / Price Mart (Kansas City, Missouri area) – unrelated to Price Chopper in the Northeast
 SunFresh
 ThriftWay
 Associated Grocers of the South
Associated Supermarkets
 Associated Wholesale Grocers
 Associated Wholesalers
C-Town
 Central Grocers Cooperative
 Great Valu (Delaware, Maryland, New Jersey, North Carolina, Virginia, West Virginia)
 IGA
 Shurfine Markets (Pennsylvania, New York, Maryland)
 ShurSave/Gerrity's Supermarkets (northeastern Pennsylvania)
 SpartanNash (in addition to directly owning a variety of Midwestern supermarket chains, SpartanNash is also a supplier for smaller, independent supermarkets)
 Thrift Way / Shop n Bag (New Jersey; Philadelphia)
 Unified Grocers
 Wakefern Food Corporation
 Western Family Foods (supermarket wholesaler) – formerly Pacific Mercantile Cooperative

Deep-discount and limited-assortment chains 
Aldi – Owned by Aldi Süd
Big Lots
Dollar General
Family Dollar
Five Below
Grocery Outlet (Alabama, Arkansas, Arizona, California, Colorado, Connecticut, Delaware, Florida, Georgia, Illinois, Iowa, Indiana, Kansas, Kentucky, District of Columbia, Virginia, West Virginia, New Jersey, New York, North Carolina, South Carolina, Tennessee, Virginia, Ohio, Oklahoma, Oregon, Colorado, Florida, Idaho, Louisiana, Michigan, Minnesota, Mississippi, Missouri, Montana, Nebraska, Nevada, New Mexico, North Dakota, South Dakota, Texas, Utah, Washington, Wisconsin, Wyoming, Maryland, Massachusetts, Hawaii, Alaska, New Hampshire, Maine, Rhode Island and Pennsylvania)
WinCo Foods (Alabama, Arkansas, Arizona, California, Colorado, Connecticut, Delaware, Florida, Georgia, Illinois, Iowa, Indiana, Kansas, Kentucky, District of Columbia, Virginia, West Virginia, New Jersey, New York, North Carolina, South Carolina, Tennessee, Virginia, Ohio, Oklahoma, Oregon, Colorado, Florida, Idaho, Louisiana, Michigan, Minnesota, Mississippi, Missouri, Montana, Nebraska, Nevada, New Mexico, North Dakota, South Dakota, Texas, Utah, Washington, Wisconsin, Wyoming, Maryland, Massachusetts, Hawaii, Alaska, New Hampshire, Maine, Rhode Island and Pennsylvania)

Ethnic chains

Asian 
99 Ranch Market – the largest Asian-American supermarket chain on the West Coast with additional locations in Nevada, Texas, Virginia, Maryland, New Jersey, and Massachusetts.
Ai Hoa Supermarket – formerly a Chinese-Vietnamese-American chain in southern California; now operates one store in South El Monte
Asian Food Center (New Jersey)
ASSI Plaza, Korean-American multinational supermarket chain (Georgia, Illinois, Pennsylvania)
CAM Asian Market (Ohio)
C-Mart Supermarket (Boston)
Food Maxx International (Virginia)
Fei Long Market (New York)
Fresh International Market, Pan-Asian and international supermarket chain (Michigan, Indiana, Illinois, Missouri, North Carolina)
Galleria Market (southern California) – Korean American
Global Food International (Maryland, Virginia)
Good Fortune Supermarket (New York, New Jersey, Virginia, Texas, Rhode Island and California)
Great Wall Supermarket (Georgia, Massachusetts, New Jersey, New York, Virginia)
Grand Mart, Korean-American supermarket chain (Washington, D.C., North Carolina and Georgia)
Hannam (New Jersey, California)
Hanyang Mart (New York, New Jersey)
H Mart, Han Ah Reum – the largest Asian-American and the largest Korean-American chain in the United States (California, Colorado, Georgia, Illinois, Louisiana, Maryland, Massachusetts, Michigan, New Jersey, New York, North Carolina, Oregon, Pennsylvania, Texas, Virginia, Washington) - Korean-American supermarket chain
H K Market 
Hong Kong Food Market – Vietnamese supermarket (Louisiana)
Hong Kong Supermarket – Chinese-American supermarket chain
India Bazaar – Indian supermarket chain in Dallas-Fort Worth Metroplex
Island Pacific Supermarket (California, Nevada) – Filipino American
J-mart (New York)
Kam Man Food (New York, New Jersey, Massachusetts) – small Asian American supermarket chain
Lion Food (Northern California) – Vietnamese-Chinese supermarket
Lotte Plaza – Korean-American supermarket (Maryland, Virginia)
Marukai – Japanese American supermarket
Mitsuwa (New Jersey, Illinois, California, Texas) – Japanese American supermarket and shopping center
Nam Dae Mun Farmers Market (Georgia)
New India Bazar (California) – small Indian, Pakistani and Sri-Lankan supermarket chain in San Francisco Bay Area
Nijiya Market (California, Hawaii) – organic Japanese American supermarket
O-Mart, Super Oriental Market (Killeen, Texas)
Ocean Mart (Utah)
Pacific Ocean Marketplace (Colorado)
Patel Brothers – largest Indian American supermarket chain
Rani's World Foods (Texas & Nevada) – Indian supermarket chain
Seafood City (California, Hawaii, Washington, Nevada, Illinois) – Filipino American
Skyfood Supermarket (six locations in New York) – Asian Oriental Supermarket. First oriental e-commerce supermarket to offer local delivery and nationwide shipping.
Subzi Bazaar (New Jersey and New York) – South East Asian/Indian Grocery Stores
Shun Fat Supermarket (California, Nevada, Texas) – Chinese Vietnamese American chain
Super G Mart, Korean-American supermarket (Charlotte, North Carolina)
Uwajimaya (Seattle, Washington; Portland, Oregon)
zTao Marketplace (Texas, Georgia) – Asian American supermarket

Hispanic/Latino 
Bravo (Northeast and Florida)
El Ahorro Supermarket – Texas
Fiesta Mart – Latino-American, Texas
Mi Pueblo Food Center (Northern California/Bay Area) – Now merged with Cardenas Supermarkets since late 2017
Mi Tienda – Hispanic supermarket division of HEB Stores (two stores in Houston, Texas)
La Michoacana Meat Market (Texas)
Nam Dae Mun Farmers Market (Georgia)
Numero Uno Market – Hispanic chain (Los Angeles area)
 La Perla Tapatía Supermarkets – (California)
 La Placita – Hispanic chain in New Orleans area
 Presidente (South Florida - Miami-Dade, Broward & Palm Beach counties)
 Pro's Ranch Market / Los Altos Ranch Market – Hispanic (Arizona, California, New Mexico, Texas)
Publix Sabor – Hispanic, operated by Publix
El Pueblo (Newark) – largest Latino supermarket in New Jersey
R Ranch Markets – Hispanic chain in southern California
El Rancho – growing independent Hispanic chain in the Dallas/Fort Worth, Texas area
Rancho Liborio (California, Nevada, Colorado)
Rancho Markets (Utah)
El Rey (Wisconsin)
El Rio Grande Latin Market (Texas)
 Rio Ranch Markets – Southern California
Saver's Cost Plus (Texas)
Sedano's – Hispanic chain in southern Florida
Seller's Bros. (Houston, Texas)
El Super (Los Angeles, southern Nevada and Phoenix)
La Bonita (Los Angeles, southern Nevada)
 Super Market Mexico – online purveyor of Mexican foods
Superior Super Warehouse – Hispanic warehouse supermarket chain in southern California
Supermercado El Rancho – Hispanic supermarket chain in Texas
 Supermercados Teloloapan (Texas)
Supersaver Foods – Hispanic-geared; operated by Albertsons LLC; chain now closed except for a few stores in Utah
Super A Foods – Los Angeles county
Tenochtitlan Market (Utah) – upscale Latin-American
Terry's / El Mariachi Supermarkets – Hispanic chain (Dallas/Fort Worth, Texas; Oklahoma City)
Tresierras Supermarkets – (southern California)
Twin City Supermarket – Hispanic chain (New Jersey)
 Vallarta Supermarkets (California) – caters to the growing Latino population of California and sells items usually not found in more Anglo-oriented American supermarkets
Viva Markets (Utah) – Hispanic grocery market and mini-mall

Kosher 
Motty's (Spring Valley, NY)
New Day (Spring Valley, NY)
Wesley Kosher (Monsey, NY)
Evergreen (Monsey, NY)
Seasons – (New York, New Jersey)
Seven Mile Market (Pikesville, MD), the largest Kosher store in the US
Breadberry (New York)
Rockland Kosher (Monsey, New York)
Grand & Essex (New Jersey)
Western Kosher (Los Angeles)
The Market Place (Brooklyn)
Kosher Konnection (New Jersey)
Gourmet Glatt (Brooklyn, Cedarhurst, Monsey, Lakewood, Woodmere)
Gleiberman's Gourmet (Charlotte NC)

Specialty and natural foods 
The Fresh Market (Alabama, Arkansas, Arizona, California, Colorado, Connecticut, Delaware, Florida, Georgia, Illinois, Iowa, Indiana, Kansas, Kentucky, District of Columbia, Virginia, West Virginia, New Jersey, New York, North Carolina, South Carolina, Tennessee, Virginia, Ohio, Oklahoma, Oregon, Colorado, Florida, Idaho, Louisiana, Michigan, Minnesota, Mississippi, Missouri, Montana, Nebraska, Nevada, New Mexico, North Dakota, South Dakota, Texas, Utah, Washington, Wisconsin, Wyoming, Maryland, Massachusetts, Hawaii, Alaska, New Hampshire, Maine, Rhode Island and Pennsylvania)
Publix Green Wise – Alabama, Florida
Sprouts Farmers Market
 Trader Joe's - Owned by  Aldi Nord
 Whole Foods – Sold To Amazon in 2017

Defunct chains

See also 

List of hypermarkets in the United States
Retailer Owned Food Distributors & Associates (trade association)
UFCW (labor union)

References 

United States

Lists of companies of the United States by industry